Dalyellia viridis is a species of rhabdocoel flatworm in the family Dalyelliidae.

Description 
The animal is usually colored intensively green due to zoochlorellae. It is 2.5 to 4 mm long with a rounded anterior and pointed posterior end. It possesses a pair of kidney-shaped eyes. Mature animals carry many eggs in their body.

Taxonomy 
It was described in 1791 by George Shaw as Hirudo viridis.

Distribution and habitat 
It occurs in freshwater in stagnant waterbodies. It is most frequently found in temporary pools.

Ecology and behavior 
The animal harbors symbiotic green algae (zoochlorellae) of the species Chlorella vulgaris in its body. It feeds on algae and animals, including microturbellarians.

References 

Rhabdocoela
Species described in 1791